OPS 3762, also known as FTV-2355, was an American reconnaissance satellite which was launched in 1964. It was the first radar imaging satellite to be launched, and the only Quill spacecraft to fly. Its mission was to demonstrate radar imaging techniques for future missions. However, the programme was cancelled before any more satellites were launched.

OPS 3762 was successfully launched aboard a Thrust Augmented Thor SLV-2A Agena-D carrier rocket, flying from Launch Complex 75-1-1 at the Vandenberg Air Force Base. The launch, which was the last orbital launch of the year, occurred at 19:08:56 UTC on 21 December 1964, and successfully placed the spacecraft into the low Earth orbit in which it conducted its mission. Owing to concerns that using radar over the Soviet Union may have been seen as provocative, OPS 3762 conducted imaging tests over the Northwestern United States instead.

OPS 3762 was a  spacecraft, based on the Agena-D which also served as the upper stage of its carrier rocket. It operated for four days. Its side looking airborne radar produced images, which were returned in a KH-4 film capsule at the end of the mission. OPS 3762 itself remained in orbit until 11 January 1965, when its orbit decayed and it reentered the atmosphere. OPS 3762 completed its mission successfully.

See also

 1964 in spaceflight

References

Spacecraft launched in 1964
Space synthetic aperture radar